Alfredo Lemus (born 1 April 1952) is a Venezuelan boxer. He competed at the 1972 Summer Olympics and the 1976 Summer Olympics. He finished in third place at the 1975 Pan American Games in the light-middleweight division.

References

External links
 

1952 births
Living people
Venezuelan male boxers
Olympic boxers of Venezuela
Boxers at the 1972 Summer Olympics
Boxers at the 1976 Summer Olympics
Boxers at the 1975 Pan American Games
Pan American Games bronze medalists for Venezuela
Pan American Games medalists in boxing
Place of birth missing (living people)
AIBA World Boxing Championships medalists
Light-middleweight boxers
Medalists at the 1975 Pan American Games
20th-century Venezuelan people
21st-century Venezuelan people